Pyritis is a genus of hoverfly, from the family Syrphidae, in the order Diptera.

Species
P. kincaidii (Coquillett, 1895)

References

External links
See BugGuide page for image: http://bugguide.net/node/view/377527

Diptera of North America
Hoverfly genera
Eristalinae